The Battle of Şırnak was  a major battle broke out in the city of Şırnak between Kurdistan Workers' Party (PKK) and Turkish security forces from 18 to 21 August 1992, after PKK members had built barricades. During this battle over 20,000 of Şırnak's 25,000 inhabitants fled the town due to the violence. According to Turkish authorities, a total of 147 people were killed, including 40 members of security forces, 85 rebels and 22 civilians.

According to the Turkish government, the clashes started when a large force of PKK guerrillas attacked government buildings in Şırnak on the night of 18 August, and that security forces responded by  bombing, heavy shelling and firing on rebel positions in local houses and shops. The PKK however denied they had launched the attacks that sparked the battle, which continued for over 48 hours. Following the battle a curfew was imposed in the town.

Similar operations were later launched in the towns of Kulp in Diyarbakır Province on 3 October 1992, and Varto in Muş Province on 17 September 1996.

Controversy
Amnesty International identified 15 of the civilians killed as Hezni Erkol, Güler Sökmen (13), Zehra Koval, Veysi Sökmen (6), Halime Kürtel, Sema Sökmen (9), Süleyman Kürtel, Kumru Güngen, Abdulaziz Besin, Gülüm Güngen (6), Haci Kiliç, Menive Güngen (14), Yusuf Vatan, Ibrahim Artuç and Yusuf Yaman. They claimed that reporters "were prevented from speaking to local political officials by the police, and there was no way to get an objective account of what had happened" and that "those who managed to approach reporters in secrecy could only say they were under fire for two days and claim that tanks and cannons were used to hit buildings occupied by civilians." They also claimed there were further attacks on civilians in villages surrounding Şırnak. On 26 August, Amnesty International sent requests to Turkish Prime Minister, Süleyman Demirel, Interior Minister Ismet Sezgin, Emergency Legislation Governor Ünal Erkan and Şırnak province governor Mustafa Mala, to immediately initiate an independent and impartial inquiry into the events, to ensure no-one was mistreated in police custody and to make their findings public.

British journalist Christopher de Bellaigue, in his book Rebel Land: Among Turkey's Forgotten People claimed that "when the dust settled, and guerilla numbers were revised steadily downwards and locals started to talk, it became clear that there had been no PKK force, not even a small one [present in the town]. The battle of Sirnak had not been a battle but a drawn out punitive spasm, a two-day spree by vandals wearing the colours of the Turkish state and trashing anything they saw"

See also
 October 2007 clashes in Şırnak
 Siege of Varto
 2015-16 Şırnak clashes

References

Sources
 Sertaç Doğan, Şırnak Yanıyor 1992, Do Yayınları, 2008, 

History of the Kurdistan Workers' Party
Conflicts in 1992
Sirnak
1992 in Turkey
Şırnak Province
History of Şırnak
August 1992 events in Asia